The 1905 Oklahoma Sooners football team represented the University of Oklahoma as an independent during the 1905 college football season. In their first year under head coach Bennie Owen, the Sooners compiled a 7–2 record, and outscored their opponents by a combined total of 229 to 59. This was first year that the Sooners defeated the Texas Longhorns.

Schedule

References

Oklahoma
Oklahoma Sooners football seasons
Oklahoma Sooners football